Lozovoye is a rural locality (a selo) and the administrative center of Lozovskoye 1-ye Rural Settlement, Verkhnemamonsky District, Voronezh Oblast, Russia. The population was 1,220 as of 2010. There are 14 streets.

Geography 
Lozovoye is located 13 km north of Verkhny Mamon (the district's administrative centre) by road. Prirechnoye is the nearest rural locality.

References 

Rural localities in Verkhnemamonsky District
Pavlovsky Uyezd, Voronezh Governorate